Steinhoff is a German surname. Notable people with the surname include:

 Bruno Steinhoff (born 1937), German billionaire businessman, founder of Steinhoff International
 Ernst Steinhoff (1908-1987), German rocket scientist
 Fritz Steinhoff (1897-1969), German politciian
 Gerda Steinhoff (1922-1946), Nazi SS concentration camp overseer hanged for war crimes
 Hans Steinhoff, German film director
 Johannes Steinhoff (1913-1994), German Luftwaffe pilot
 John Steinhoff (born 1942), classical physicist
 Karl Steinhoff (1892-1981), Minister-President of Brandenburg

de:Steinhoff